Jon Spencer (born February 5, 1965) is an American singer, composer and guitarist. He has been involved in multiple musical acts, such as Pussy Galore, Boss Hog, Heavy Trash and The Jon Spencer Blues Explosion.

History 
Jon Spencer was born on 5 February 1965 in Hanover, New Hampshire, to a university professor and a cardiology technician. He attended Brown University in Providence, Rhode Island, where he was part of the noise rock band Shithaus, which included future Cop Shoot Cop vocalist Tod Ashley. The band was short lived and had a musical style reminiscent of the industrial music of Einstürzende Neubauten. He moved to Washington, D.C., and formed Pussy Galore, who quickly relocated to New York.

He is also known for bringing attention to and popularizing the blues artist R. L. Burnside, who started touring and working with The Blues Explosion in the mid-1990s after playing and living in obscurity for three decades.

In 2022, he announced the end of the Jon Spencer Blues Explosion and the debut of his new band, Jon Spencer & the Hitmakers, which includes Quasi's Sam Coomes and Janet Weiss.

References

External links 
 
 

1965 births
American rock guitarists
American male guitarists
American rock singers
American male singer-songwriters
American rock songwriters
Noise rock musicians
Living people
Singers from New Hampshire
American noise musicians
People from Hanover, New Hampshire
Pussy Galore (band) members
Guitarists from New Hampshire
20th-century American guitarists
20th-century American male musicians
Brown University alumni